Grapevine Creek may refer to one of the following streams:

 Grapevine Creek (Coconino County, Arizona)
 Grapevine Creek (Apache County, Arizona)
 Grapevine Creek (Yavapai County, Arizona)
 Grapevine Creek (Tallapoosa County, Alabama)
 Grapevine Creek (Washington County, Alabama)
 Grapevine Creek (Tulare County, California)
 Grapevine Creek (Sonoma County, California)
 Grapevine Creek (Mendocino County, California)
 Grapevine Creek (Humboldt County, California)
 Grapevine Creek (Tulare County, California)
 Grapevine Creek (Tuolumne County, California)
 Grapevine Creek (Lake County, California)
 Grapevine Creek (San Diego County, California)
 Grapevine Creek (Lake County, California)
 Grapevine Creek (Riverside County, California)
 Grapevine Creek (San Bernardino County, California)
 Grapevine Creek (Santa Barbara County, California)
 Grapevine Creek (Kern County, California)
 Grapevine Creek (Pike County, Kentucky)
 Grapevine Creek (Mercer County, Kentucky)
 Grapevine Creek (Perry County, Kentucky)
 Grapevine Creek (Attala County, Mississippi)
 Grapevine Creek (Big Horn County, Montana)
 Grapevine Creek (Trumbull County, Ohio)
 Grapevine Creek (Real County, Texas)
 Grapevine Creek (Dallas County, Texas)
 Grapevine Creek (Gray County, Texas)
 Grapevine Creek (Wise County, Texas)
 Grapevine Creek (Gray County, Texas)
 Grapevine Creek (Dickens County, Texas)
 Grapevine Creek (Wilbarger County, Texas)
 Grapevine Creek (Moore County, Texas)
 Grapevine Creek (Wise County, Texas)
 Grapevine Creek (Mingo County, West Virginia)
 Grapevine Creek (Kanawha County, West Virginia)